Guglielmo Giovannini (17 December 1925 – 17 July 1990) was an Italian footballer who played as a defender. He competed in the men's tournament at the 1948 Summer Olympics.

References

External links
 

1925 births
1990 deaths
Italian footballers
Italy international footballers
Olympic footballers of Italy
Footballers at the 1948 Summer Olympics
Footballers from Bologna
Association football defenders
S.S. Maceratese 1922 players
Bologna F.C. 1909 players